Bogda is a 2018 Indian Marathi-language film directed and written by Nisheeta Keni. Produced by Nitin Keni under banner of Nitin Keni Creations. It stars Suhas Joshi, Mrunmayee Deshpande and Rohit Kokate.

Cast
 Suhas Joshi as Maai
 Mrunmayee Deshpande as Tejaswini
 Rohit Kokate as Kishor
 Jayant Gadekar
 Ajinkya Bhosale

Music

References

External links

2018 films
2010s Marathi-language films